The men's decathlon competition at the 2009 Summer Universiade took place on 8 and 9 July 2009 in the Stadion Crvena Zvezda in Belgrade, Serbia.

Medalists

Records

Results

100 metres
Wind:Heat 1:  +0.5 m/s, Heat 2: -2.2 m/s

Long jump

Shot put

High jump

400 metres

110 metres hurdles
Wind:Heat 1: +0.3 m/s, Heat 2: -0.7 m/s

Discus throw

Pole vault

Javelin throw

1500 metres

Final standings

See also
2009 World Championships in Athletics – Men's decathlon
2009 Hypo-Meeting
2009 Decathlon Year Ranking

Notes

References
 Results (archived)
 Year Ranking
 sportscredentials

Decathlon
2009